Frank Morton MScTech, PhD, AMCT, DSc, FRIC, (born Sheffield 1906, died 21 January 1999 Rhos-on-Sea) was a noted professor of chemical engineering, instrumental in the creation of UMIST and commemorated by Frank Morton Sports Day and a medal named after him.

Career

Morton left school at 14, but took evening classes and then a first class degree in Chemistry at Manchester Municipal College of Technology where he was also a very active sportsman, followed by a PhD in 1936.  He then worked in Trinidad and was involved in expanding the oil refinery facilities during the Second World War.

In 1946 the Department of Chemical Engineering at the University of Birmingham was formed and he became one of the first lecturers, rising to a Professor in 1951.  In 1956 he was appointed  the first head of the newly formed Department of Chemical Engineering at Manchester College of Science and Technology (later UMIST, now the University of Manchester), UK. In 1966 a new building for the pilot plant of the department was named the Morton Laboratory.

His research publications were in the field of mass transfer in distillation and liquid-liquid contact columns.

In 1961 he instituted a sports competition between the departments of Chemical Engineering at Manchester and Birmingham. This has now expanded to include all chemical engineering departments in the UK and is an annual event, known as the Frank Morton Sports Day.

He was President of the Institution of Chemical Engineers in 1963-1964. His presidential address was entitled "Chemical Engineering Manpower - a critical survey".

In 1964 he took over as Acting Principal of the Manchester College, while the Principal, B. V. Bowden occupied a position in the Wilson government as Minister for Education and Science.  It was at Morton's initiative that the college changed its name to UMIST.

When the UK began to consider using North Sea gas as a domestic fuel, Frank Morton headed a government enquiry into its safety.

In view of his particular interest in, and contributions to, the education of chemical engineers, in 2001 the Institution of Chemical Engineers awarded the first Morton Medal "for excellence in chemical engineering education".

References

Bibliography
 F. Morton (1982) "A short history of chemical engineering in the North-West of England" in W. M. Furter (ed) (1982) A Century of Chemical Engineering 

1906 births
1999 deaths
British chemical engineers
Engineering academics
Academics of the University of Manchester Institute of Science and Technology
Academics of the University of Birmingham
People from Sheffield
Scientists from Yorkshire